José Ricardo Díaz Pardeiro, (19 November 1944 – 7 March 2022) born in Ferreira do Valadouro, Lugo, Spain, was a Galician writer and historian, writing about the city of A Coruña, in Galicia, Spain. He died on 7 March 2022, at the age of 77.

Bibliography

Books
 La vida cultural en la Coruña: El Teatro, 1882-1915
 Crónicas coruñesas
 Miscelánea coruñesa

References

1944 births
2022 deaths
Spanish male writers
Writers from Galicia (Spain)
20th-century Spanish historians
People from A Mariña Central